Dancing 9 is a South Korean dance survival program by Mnet. 18 contestants are divided into two teams, Blue Eye and Red Wings with 9 members each. A live performance each week where the two teams perform will determine the winner. A prize of 100 million won will be given to the winning team with 300 million won worth of support for dance performances. The person chosen as the MVP will also receive a 100 million won worth of additional benefits.

The two teams also have coaches or masters who are dance experts in a specific field.

The show is hosted by Oh Sang-jin and the theme song of the show was sung by SPICA.

Season 1

Masters

Teams

Blue Eye
 Captain: Eum Moon-suk (32) - Krumping
 Lee Eun-hye (20) - Dancesport
 Lee Ji-eun (20) - Jazz Dance
 Kim Soo-ro (27) - Dancesport
 Hong Sung-sik (30) - B-boying
 Kim Sol-hee (20) - Krumping
 Kim Myung-gyu (28) - Modern Ballet
 Han Sun-chun (25) - Modern Dance
 Lee Jun-yong (30) - Hip-Hop

Red Wings
 Captain: Ha Hui-dong (35) - B-boying
 Yeo Eun-ji (22) - Waacking
 So Mun-jung (18) - Dancesport
 Kim Hong-in (19) - Dancesport
 So Young-mo (33) - Street Dance
 Nam Jin-hyun (24) - Modern Dance
 Lee Sun-tae (26) - Modern Dance
 Lee Luda (28) - Ballet
 Ryu Jin-wook (31) - Modern Dance

On the show's finale which was held on October 6, 2013, Red Wings was declared the winner of the two teams and Red Wings' Ha Hui-dong from the B-boy group T.I.P was declared the MVP.

Season 2 
Mnet announced that the show would be returning for another season and has opened up a global casting call. Red Wings masters from the first season Lee Min-woo, Woo Hyun-young and Park Ji-woo would be returning as masters for Red Wings. Season 1 winner Ha Hui-dong would be joining them. On April 1, 2014, Mnet released a teaser introducing Jay Park (Park Jae-bum) as Blue Eye's new street and K-pop master. He will be joining Park Ji-eun and Lee Yong-woo who returned as Blue Eye's masters for the second season and another new dance master, actor Kim Su-ro. The show's second season premiered on June 13.

Masters

Teams

Blue Eye
Captain: Yoon Jeon-il (28) - Ballet
 Kim Seol-jin (34) - Modern Dance
 Ahn Nam-geun (29) - Modern Dance
 Kim Ki-soo (28) - B-boying
 Lee Ji-eun (30) - Dancesport
 Im Saet-byul (28) - Modern Dance
 Kim Tae-hyun (25) - Krumping
 Park In-soo (23) - B-boying
 Choi Nam-mi (22) - Waacking

Red Wings
Captain: Shin Kyu-sang (30) - B-boying
 Son Byung-hyun (32) - House
 Lee Yoon-hee (30) - Modern Dance
 Choi Soo-jin (30) - Modern Dance
 Kim Kyung-il (28) - Modern Dance
 Lee Yoo-min (29) - Locking
 Yoon Na-ra (26) - Modern Dance
 Ahn Hye-sang (24) - Dancesport
 Park Jung-eun (18) - Street Dance

Final Battles

Pre-1st Final Battle
Opponent team pick songs

 MC: Din-Din
 DJ: Jung Jin-wook
 Judge: Cha Jin-yeob, Lee Yoon-kyung, Hong Se-Jung, Kim Yong-soo, Lee Woo-Sung, Kim Hak-soo (G-haksu), Jo Seung-ho
 Theme: Water Dance
 Result: Red Wings vs Blue Eye (1-6) Blue Eye WIN, Blue Eye got score 3 for 1st Final Battle

1st Final League Dream Match
 Judge: Cha Jin-yeob, Lee Yoon-kyung, Hong Se-Jung, Kim Yong-soo, Lee Woo-Sung, Kim Hak-soo (G-haksu), Jo Seung-ho

Final Result

Pre-2nd Final Battle

 Judge: Matthew Jessner, Emma Delmenico, James Cooper
 Result: Red Wings vs Blue Eye (3-0) Red Wings WIN, Red Wings got score 3 for 2nd Final Battle

2nd Final League Master Match
 Judge: Kim Ji Young, Cha Jin Yeob, Kim Young Jin, Hong Se Jeong, Lee Woo Seong, Boogaloo Kin, Jo Seung Ho

Final Result

Pre-3rd Final Battle

 Judge: Nam Kyung-joo, Jamal Sims, Dondraico Johnson
 Theme: The Original
 Result: Red Wings vs Blue Eye (0-3) Blue Eye WIN, Blue Eye got score 3 for 3rd Final Battle

3rd Final League Mix Match
 Judge: Jamal Sims, Kim Ji-young, Cha Jin-yeob, Kim Seong-young, Hong Se-jeong, Lee Woo-Seong, Jo Seung-ho

Final Result

Season finale
On August 16, 2014, with a final score of 1-2, Blue Eye was declared the winner and Blue Eye's Kim Seol-jin was declared the MVP of the second season.

References

2013 South Korean television series debuts
Dance competition television shows
South Korean game shows
Korean-language television shows
Mnet (TV channel) original programming
Television series by SM C&C